Surdas  (IAST: Sūr, Devanagari: सूर) was a 16th-century blind Hindu devotional poet and singer, who was known for his works written in praise of Krishna, the supreme lord. He was a Vaishnava devotee of Lord Krishna, and he was also a revered poet and singer. His compositions glorified and captured his devotion towards lord Krishna. Most of his poems were written in the Braj language, while some were also written in other dialects of medieval Hindi, like Awadhi.

There are many theories about Surdas, but most popularly, he is said to have been blind from birth. During his time, lived another saint by the name of Vallabhacharya. Vallabhacharya was the founder of the Pushti Marg Sampraday, and his successor, Vithalnath, had selected eight poets who would help him to further spread the glory of lord Krishna, by composing works of music. These eight poets were known as the "Astachap", and Surdas is believed to be the foremost among them due to his outstanding devotion and poetic talent.

The book Sur Sagar (Sur's Ocean) is traditionally attributed to Surdas. However, many of the poems in the book seem to be written by later poets in Sur's name. The Sur Sagar in its present form focuses on descriptions of Krishna as the lovely child of Gokul and Vraj, written from the gopis''' perspective.

Biography

There is disagreement regarding the exact birth date of Surdas, with the general consensus among scholars holding it to be in the year 1478. The birthday of Surdas is celebrated as Surdas Jayanti in the Vaishnav calendar, on the 5th day of the Hindu month of Vaishakh. We are uncertain of his exact date of death, but it is considered to be somewhere between 1561 and 1584. (Age 101 years). There is some disagreement regarding the birthplace of Surdas too, as some scholars say he was born in the village Ranukta or Renuka which lies on the road passing through Agra to Mathura, while some say he was born in a village called Sihi, near Delhi.

According to one theory, Surdas was blind from birth and neglected by his poor family, forcing him to leave his home at the age of six. Later, he met Vallabha Acharya and became his disciple. Under Vallabha Acharya's guidance and training, Surdas memorized the Shrimad Bhagvata, studied the Hindu scriptures, and gave lectures on philosophical and religious subjects. He remained celibate throughout his life

Poetic works 
Surdas is best known for his composition the Sur Sagar. Most of the poems in the composition, although attributed to him, seem to be composed by later poets in his name. 
Sursagar in its 16th century form contain descriptions of Krishna and Radha as lovers; the longing of Radha and the gopis for Krishna when he is absent and vice versa. In addition, poems of Sur's own personal bhakti are prominent, and episodes from the Ramayana and Mahabharata also appear. The Sursagar's modern reputation focuses on descriptions of Krishna as a lovable child, usually drawn from the perspective of one of the cowherding gopis of Braj.

Surdas also composed the Sur Saravali and Sahitya Lahari. In contemporary writings, it is said to contain one lakh verses, out of which many were lost due to obscurity and uncertainty of the times. It is analogical to the festival of (Holi), where the Lord is the Great Player, who, in his playful mood, creates the universe and the Primerial man out of himself, who has the three gunas, namely Sattva, Rajas and Tamas. He describes 24 incarnations of the Lord interspersed with the legends of Dhruva and Prahlada. He then narrates the story of the incarnation of Krishna. This is followed by a description of the Vasant (Spring) and Holi festivals. Sahitya Lahari consists of 118 verses and emphasises on Bhakti (devotion).

Sur's compositions are also found in the Guru Granth Sahib, the holy book of the Sikhs.

Influence
Bhakti Movement
Surdas was a part of the Bhakti movement spreading across the Indian subcontinent. This movement represented spiritual empowerment of the masses. The corresponding spiritual movement of the masses first happened in South India in the seventh century and spread to North India in the 14th-17th centuries.

Braj Bhasha 
Surdas's poetry was written in a dialect of Hindi called Braj Bhasha, until then considered to be a very plebeian language, as the prevalent literary languages were either Persian or Sanskrit.  His work raised the status of the Braj Bhasha from a crude language to that of a literary one.

Philosophy
Eight disciples of Vallabha Acharya are called the Aṣṭachāp, (Eight seals in Hindi), named after the oral signature chap written at the conclusion of literary works. Sur is considered to be the foremost among them.

In popular culture

Several films have been made about the poet's life. These include: Surdas (1939) by Krishna Dev Mehra, Bhakta Surdas (1942) by Chaturbhuj Doshi, Sant Surdas (1975) by Ravindra Dave, Chintamani Surdas (1988) by Ram Pahwa.

The legend of the blind poet Bilwamangala (identified with Surdas) and Chintamani has also been adapted several times in Indian cinema. These films include: Bilwamangal or Bhagat Soordas (1919) by Rustomji Dhotiwala, Bilwamangal (1932), Chintamani (1933) by Kallakuri Sadasiva Rao, Chintamani (1937) by Y. V. Rao, Bhakta Bilwamangal (1948) by Shanti Kumar, Bilwamangal (1954) by D. N. Madhok, Bhakta Bilwamangal (1954) by Pinaki Bhushan Mukherji, Chintamani (1956) by P. S. Ramakrishna Rao, Chintamani (1957) by M.N. Basavarajaiah, Chilamboli (1963) by G. K. Ramu, Bilwamangal (1976) by Gobinda Roy, Vilvamangal Ki Pratigya'' (1996) by Sanjay Virmani.

See also
 Main Naahin Maakhan Khaayo
 Sant Mat
 Bhajan
 Sant Surdas (Sihi) metro station

References

External links 
 

Hindu poets
Sant Mat
16th-century Hindu religious leaders
Vaishnava saints
Hindi-language poets
Hindu revivalists
Sikh Bhagats
Indian centenarians
Bhakti movement
15th-century Indian scholars
15th-century Indian poets
Poets from Uttar Pradesh
Scholars from Uttar Pradesh
1478 births
1561 deaths
Blind poets